Parliamentary elections were held in Greece on 17 November 1902. Supporters of Theodoros Deligiannis emerged as the largest bloc in Parliament, with 110 of the 235 seats. Deligiannis became Prime Minister for the fourth time on 6 December.

Results

References

Greece
Parliamentary elections in Greece
1902 in Greece
Greece
1900s in Greek politics
1902 elections in Greece